The W82 (also known as the XM785 shell) was a low-yield tactical nuclear warhead developed by the United States and designed to be used in a 155 mm artillery shell.  It was conceived as a more flexible replacement for the W48, the previous generation of  nuclear artillery shell.  A previous attempt to replace the W48 with the W74 munition was canceled due to cost.

Originally envisioned as a dual-purpose weapon, with interchangeable components to allow the shell to function as either a standard fission explosive or an enhanced radiation device, the warhead was developed at Lawrence Livermore Laboratory starting in 1977. The unit cost of the weapon was estimated at  million. Although enhanced radiation devices were considered more effective at blunting an invasion due to the high neutron flux they produce, the more complex design eventually led to the cancellation of the dual-purpose W-82-0 program in 1982. Development of a standard weapon, the W-82-1, was restarted in 1986. The program was finally cancelled in 1991 due to the end of the Cold War.

Design
The shell used a body made from titanium with a copper rotating band. A special process was developed to bond the rotating band to the titanium body of the shell which prevented shell-band separation during firing.

References

Further reading 
* Hansen, Chuck, "Swords of Armageddon: U.S. Nuclear Weapons Development since 1945" (CD-ROM & download available). PDF-2.67 Mb. 2,600 pages, Sunnyvale, California, Chucklea Publications, 1995, 2007.  (2nd Ed.)

External links 
A photo of a W82 shell

Nuclear warheads of the United States
Linear implosion nuclear weapons
Nuclear artillery